Sandip Trivedi (born 1963) is an Indian theoretical physicist working at Tata Institute for Fundamental Research (TIFR) at Mumbai, India, while he is its current director. He is well known for his contributions to string theory, in particular finding (along with Renata Kallosh, Andrei Linde, and Shamit Kachru) the first models of accelerated expansion of the universe in low energy supersymmetric string (see KKLT mechanism). His research areas include string theory, cosmology and particle physics. He is now member of program advisory board of International Center for Theoretical Sciences (ICTS). He is also the recipient of the Infosys Prize 2010 in the category of Physical Sciences.

Education
He completed his master of science (Integrated) in physics from IIT Kanpur in 1985. He was awarded his PhD in 1990 from Caltech, Pasadena, USA. Later he went on to work as a post-doctoral research associate at IAS, Princeton until 1992.

Awards
He won the prestigious Shanti Swarup Bhatnagar Award in the Physical Sciences in 2005. He was the recipient of the Infosys Prize 2010 in the category of Physical Sciences. He is also a recipient of the TWAS Prize in Physics in 2015.

References

External links
 Sandip Trivedi's Home Page at TIFR
 List of Publications on SPIRES

20th-century Indian physicists
Indian string theorists
Living people
1963 births
IIT Kanpur alumni
Academic staff of Tata Institute of Fundamental Research
TWAS laureates